A list of animated television series first aired in 1975.

See also
 List of animated feature films of 1975
 List of Japanese animation television series of 1975

References

Television series
Animated series
1975
1975
1975-related lists